The 1980 FIBA European Championship for Cadettes was the third edition of the European basketball championship for U16 women's teams, today known as FIBA U16 Women's European Championship. 12 teams featured in the competition, held in Zalaegerszeg and Pécs, Hungary, from 6 to 14 August 1980.

The Soviet Union won their third title in a row.

Participating teams

Preliminary round
In the preliminary round, the twelve teams were allocated in two groups of six teams each. The top three teams of each group advanced to the final group.  The last three teams of each group qualified for the classification group.

Group A

|

|}

Group B

|

|}

Classification round
In this stage, the last three teams of each group of the preliminary round competed for the 7th-12th place. The games between teams of the same group in the previous round were taken into account.

Group X

|

|}

Finals
In this stage, the top three teams of each group of the preliminary round competed for the Championship. The games between teams of the same group in the previous round were taken into account.

Group X

|

|}

Final standings

External links
Official Site

FIBA U16 Women's European Championship
1980–81 in European women's basketball
1980 in Hungarian sport
International youth basketball competitions hosted by Hungary
International women's basketball competitions hosted by Hungary